Bill Eldridge was an Australian producer. He worked at ABC radio as an actor and producer. He also produced some early TV plays such as Roundabout.
Eldridge was a BBC Radio producer and came to Perth in 1947.

Select Credits
Candida (1951) - radio play - actor
Deadly Nightshade (1954) - actor
Camera Club (1957)
Roundabout (1957) - director
Symphonie Pastorale (1958) - director
Seeing Stars (1958) - TV variety show - director
They Found a Cave (1962) - writer

References

External links
Bill Eldridge at IMDb

Australian television producers
Australian radio producers
Australian male radio actors
BBC radio producers